Annie's Homegrown (or simply Annie's) is an American organic food company owned by General Mills. The company was founded in Hampton, Connecticut by Annie Withey and Andrew Martin, who had previously founded Smartfood popcorn along with Ken Meyers. It is best known for its macaroni and cheese product line, which comes in shell form and bunny rabbit shapes, and is the second best selling macaroni and cheese in the United States behind Kraft.  Their mascot is a rabbit named Bernie, who appears in the seal of approval called the "Rabbit of Approval" and another slogan called "Bunny of Approval" in 2020. The company also produces Annie's Naturals, which consists of condiments, dressings, and barbecue sauces.

History
Annie Withey co-founded Annie's Homegrown with Andrew Martin in 1989. Initially, the company only sold "natural" macaroni and cheese in New England supermarkets.

In 1995, Annie's completed a direct public offering that raised $1.3 million.

In 1999, John Foraker, an owner of Homegrown Natural Foods, which made flavored olive oils and mustards, and his company invested $2 million in Annie's. An agreement was reached that would buy out Withey and Martin's shares in the company and make Annie's a private company. Withey became Annie's "inspirational president", and the company began distributing its products to chains like Costco, Kroger, and Safeway.

In 2002, Solera Capital became the majority investor in the company with $23 million. They also added Foraker's company Homegrown Naturals (including brands Consorzio and Fantastic Foods) to the business and moved Annie's headquarters from Boston to Napa, California, in 2004.  Later in 2011, Annie's headquarters relocated from Napa to Berkeley, California.

In 2005, the company bought out Annie's Naturals, a (sometimes) organic salad dressing and condiment company founded by Annie Christopher of North Calais, Vermont.

The majority of Annie's stock was owned by Solera Capital, LLC. In December 2011, Annie's filed with the SEC to raise up to $100 million in an initial public offering.

In January 2012, Annie's announced the introduction of a certified organic rising crust frozen pizza line. Annie's certified organic pizza line is exclusive to Whole Foods Market.

On April 3, 2014, Annie's opened their first bakery manufacturing plant, purchased from Safeway Inc. for $7.4 million and located in Joplin, Missouri.

General Mills acquired Annie's on September 8, 2014, for $820 million.

See also 
 List of food companies

References

Further reading

External links 

 

Organic farming organizations
Food manufacturers of the United States
Companies based in Berkeley, California
1989 establishments in Connecticut
Food and drink companies established in 1989
Food and drink in the San Francisco Bay Area
Food and drink companies based in California
General Mills brands
2014 mergers and acquisitions